Technobiophilia is 'the innate tendency to focus on life and lifelike processes as they appear in technology'.

The concept was devised by Sue Thomas as an extrapolation of the Biophilia hypothesis introduced by biologist Edward O. Wilson in his book Biophilia (1984). where he defines biophilia as 'the innate tendency to focus on life and lifelike processes.'

Technophilic practices and artefacts have one or more of the following features. They
 connect our lives in nature with our lives in the digital
 contribute to well-being via a tech-nature balance
 support future biodiversity as technology and nature move closer together.

Timothy Beatley, Teresa Heinz Professor of Sustainable Communities in the Department of Urban and Environmental Planning at the University of Virginia School of Architecture, has written of technobiophilia "We can look forward to the promise and potential of technophilic cities, that at once commit to restoring and enjoying actual nature, but acknowledge the realities of life in cities (much of it inside, and behind a screen), and the powerful ways in which our digital technologies could underpin and help to reinforce our nature-ful commitments and experiences and our biophilic tendencies."

References

External links 
 Technobiophilia
 The Future of Technobiophilia: An Interview with Sue Thomas
Confessions of a technobiophiliac, Mike Elgan, Computerworld, 28 February 2015

Psychological concepts